John Harkness Dixon (23 July 1888 – 1 April 1972) was the 7th Anglican Bishop of Montreal from 1943 to 1960 and then Metropolitan of the Ecclesiastical Province of Canada (and thus Archbishop of Montreal) for a further two years.

Born in Iroquois, Ontario he was educated at the University of Toronto before embarking on an ecclesiastical career with a curacy at Fenaghvale, Ontario. This was swiftly followed by elevation to posts in Ottawa, during which time he was appointed a  Canon of the cathedral . After a further 8 years in the Diocese of Toronto he was appointed Dean of Montreal in 1940  before being made bishop in 1943.

References

See also
List of Anglican Bishops of Montreal

1888 births
1972 deaths
University of Toronto alumni
Deans of Montreal
Anglican bishops of Montreal
20th-century Anglican Church of Canada bishops
Metropolitans of Canada